Christine Maelisa Tonkin (born 15 March 1956) is an Australian politician, who was elected as a Labor member for Churchlands in the Western Australian Legislative Assembly at the 2021 state election. She defeated Sean L'Estrange, who had held the seat since 2013. Tonkin is the first ever Labor member for Churchlands.

Early life and education
Christine Tonkin was born on 15 March 1956 in Subiaco, Western Australia, to Haydn Joseph Tonkin, an electrical draftsman, and Irene May Tonkin (née Jones). She attended Our Lady Help of Christians Primary School, in East Victoria Park, St Joachim High School, in Victoria Park, and Kent Street Senior High School, in East Victoria Park. She studied for a Bachelor of Arts at Monash University in Melbourne, a Master of Business Administration at the Queensland University of Technology, and a Graduate Diploma of Procurement Management, at Griffith University.

Career
Tonkin is an expert in public procurement reform, having worked in it for 25 years, including for the United Nations in places such as Denmark, Sudan, Papua New Guinea, Austria and Bangladesh.

She joined the WA Labor Party on 13 July 2015.

At the 2021 Western Australian state election, she was elected to the electoral district of Churchlands in the Western Australian Legislative Assembly, defeating Liberal Party member Sean L'Estrange, who had held the seat since 2013. She was the first Labor member for this electorate.

References

1956 births
Living people
Australian Labor Party members of the Parliament of Western Australia
Members of the Western Australian Legislative Assembly
Women members of the Western Australian Legislative Assembly
21st-century Australian politicians
21st-century Australian women politicians
People educated at Kent Street Senior High School